Look What's Happened to Rosemary's Baby (also known as Rosemary's Baby Part II) is a 1976 American made-for-television horror film and a sequel to Roman Polanski's 1968 film Rosemary's Baby starring Stephen McHattie, Patty Duke, George Maharis, Ruth Gordon and Ray Milland. The film premiered as the ABC Friday Night Movie on October 29, 1976.

It has little connection to the novel by Ira Levin, on which the first film was based.  It is not based on Levin's sequel novel, Son of Rosemary, which was published later, although there are some similarities (e.g. the child in both stories is called Andrew/Andy).

The only actor to return from the first film is Ruth Gordon as Minnie Castevet.  Sam O'Steen, an editor on the first movie, directed this sequel. Patty Duke, who plays Rosemary, was considered for the role in the 1968 film; it went to Mia Farrow.

Plot

The Book of Rosemary
The first scene opens with the coven preparing for a ritual, only to discover that Adrian (Rosemary's baby), now eight years old, is missing from his room. Knowing Rosemary (Patty Duke) must be responsible for this, the coven members use her personal possessions to enable the forces of evil to locate her. Rosemary and Adrian are hiding in a synagogue for shelter. While hiding there, supernatural events begin to affect the rabbis. However, as they are seeking sanctuary in a house of God, the coven is unable to affect them.

The next morning, Guy (George Maharis), now a famous movie star, gets a call from Roman Castevet (Ray Milland). Roman informs Guy that both Rosemary and Adrian are missing and that Rosemary may attempt to contact him. Later that night, Rosemary and Adrian are sheltering in a bus stop. Rosemary makes a phone call to Guy, while Adrian plays with his toy car nearby. As soon as Guy answers the phone, Rosemary immediately issues instructions on how to send her money. Outside, some local children start teasing Adrian and bullying him by stealing his toy car. Suddenly, in a fit of rage, Adrian knocks the children unconscious to the ground. After hearing all the noise, Rosemary hangs up the telephone and runs outside to find Adrian. Attempting to flee, the pair are accosted by Marjean (Tina Louise), a sex worker who was a witness to the incident. Marjean offers to hide the pair in her trailer.

After a while, Rosemary asks Marjean to go see what had happened with the children. After Marjean comes back, she lies and tells Rosemary that two boys were killed. Marjean is obviously a follower of Roman and Minnie (Ruth Gordon), but she offers to help Rosemary get a ride on a bus to escape. After a bus finally arrives later that night, Rosemary enters and the doors slam shut behind her before Adrian can get on. Rosemary turns to the driver, only to discover that the bus is empty and is driving itself. Marjean holds Adrian in her arms as he sees his mother for the last time, being taken away by the possessed bus.

The Book of Adrian
Over 20 years later, an adult Adrian (Stephen McHattie) and his best friend, Peter (David Huffman), are detained by police for speeding. When Adrian arrives at his home, which is his "Aunt" Marjean's cheap casino, she confronts him about his reckless behavior. She tells him that she is always worried about him ever since his parents were "killed in an automobile accident".

Adrian then decides to go take a joyride and instigates a fight with a gang of violent bikers. Peter finds Adrian, who tells him what happened and how he has been suffering from strange nightmares and violent urges.

Later that night, Roman and Minnie arrive at the casino pretending to be Adrian's aunt and uncle. As they prepare for his birthday party, Minnie drugs Adrian into unconsciousness and dresses him up in a costume and devil makeup. Peter, who notices something is wrong, becomes even more suspicious when he sees the movie star Guy Woodhouse arriving. After Guy and Roman join the rest of the coven, they begin to chant, attempting to invoke Satan. Although it initially seems as though the ritual failed, Adrian is possessed and runs out on the casino's dance floor. Roman soon realizes that Satan is using Adrian to possess all of the innocent people on the dance floor. Guy becomes frightened and runs away. Peter intercepts Guy and attempts to make him help save Adrian. Guy panics when Peter struggles with him, so he electrocutes Peter with a broken power cord.

The Book of Andrew
Adrian regains consciousness with amnesia in a hospital. He is kept there against his will, as his fingerprints match the set that the police found on the broken power cord used to kill Peter. A nurse named Ellen (Donna Mills) tells him his name is "Adrian"; however, he insists his name is "Andrew", because he remembers his mother calling him "Andrew". Not knowing if Ellen will believe him or not, he is hesitant about telling her what he remembers about the cult. Ellen does believe him and helps him escape. When Guy is notified of Andrew's escape from the hospital, he fears Andrew may follow him and kill him in a fit of rage.

On the run, Andrew and Ellen stop at a motel, where she seduces him. She then admits to him that she is a cult member, and she drugs and rapes him. He falls asleep having a terrible nightmare of Ellen as a type of harpy that tears at his chest. When Andrew later wakes up and goes outside looking for Ellen, a speeding car tries to run him down. Andrew manages to get out of the way; however, Ellen is hit. The car crashes, killing the driver, who Andrew discovers was Guy. Confused and scared, Andrew runs away into the night.

The film ends with Roman and Minnie sitting in the waiting room of a hospital to visit their pregnant granddaughter. After the doctor informs them that the pregnancy should continue as normal, their granddaughter is revealed to be Ellen, who survived her injuries. During the end credits, Ellen is seen giving birth to Andrew's baby, Rosemary's grandchild.

Cast
 Stephen McHattie as Andrew "Adrian" Woodhouse
 Patty Duke as Rosemary Woodhouse
 Broderick Crawford as Sheriff Holtzman
 Ruth Gordon as Minnie Castevet
 Lloyd Haynes as Laykin
 David Huffman as Peter Simon
 Tina Louise as Marjean Dorn
 George Maharis as Guy Woodhouse
 Ray Milland as Roman Castevet
 Donna Mills as Ellen
 Philip Boyer as Adrian / Andrew, age 8
 Brian Richards as Dr. Lister
 Beverly Sanders as Interviewer

Reception
Daniel Goodwin wrote in Scream magazine:This little-seen sequel to Rosemary’s Baby bypasses Ira Levin’s lacklustre literary follow-up Son of Rosemary and catches up with the characters from Polanski’s classic in a gauche and bumbling chase movie/disco horror hybrid. Director Sam O’Steen, editor of Rosemary’s Baby, and writer Anthony Wilson (The Twilight Zone, Land of the Giants, Planet of the Apes) deliver a hotchpotch of awkwardly lumped together chase and dance sequences, festooned with ham acting, garish fashion, glitter balls and Satanic rituals. LWHTRB withers into a limp and hackneyed trinket throughout the first half but bounces back into a colourful calamity that lacks the artistry and finesse of Polanski’s original yet is far from a generic retread.

References

External links 

 
 
 

1976 horror films
1976 television films
ABC network original films
American supernatural horror films
American sequel films
Paramount Pictures films
Television sequel films
American horror television films
Films about cults
Films scored by Charles Bernstein
Films based on works by Ira Levin
Films about rape
1976 films
Demons in film
Fictional depictions of the Antichrist
Films about Satanism
Films about spirit possession
Films about witchcraft
Television shows about spirit possession
Films directed by Sam O'Steen
1970s American films